Tiron (trade name; systematic name disodium 4,5-dihydroxy-1,3-benzenedisulfonate) is a chemical compound used for its ability to form strong complexes with titanium and iron, as well as mixed compounds such as calcium titanium tiron.

References

Sulfonates
Catechols
Organic sodium salts